Juho Pekka Niemi (born Yliniemi, 14 November 1909 – 21 December 1993) was a Finnish cross-country skier who competed at the 1936 Winter Olympics. He won a bronze medal in the 18 km event and placed eighth over 50 km. His biggest success came at the 1937 FIS Nordic World Ski Championships, where he won a complete set of medals: a gold in the 50 km, a silver in the 4 × 10 km relay and a bronze in the 18 km. He also won the 50 km race at the 1938 Holmenkollen ski festival.

Niemi won only one medal at the national championships, a silver in the 50 km in 1935. He retired soon after the 1939 World Championships, where he placed fifth over 50 km and sixth over 18 km. He was a forest manager by profession.

Cross-country skiing results
All results are sourced from the International Ski Federation (FIS).

Olympic Games
 1 medal – (1 bronze)

World Championships
 3 medals – (1 gold, 1 silver, 1 bronze)

References

External links

 
 Holmenkollen winners since 1892 – click Vinnere for downloadable pdf file 

1909 births
1993 deaths
People from Keminmaa
Cross-country skiers at the 1936 Winter Olympics
Finnish male cross-country skiers
Holmenkollen Ski Festival winners
Olympic cross-country skiers of Finland
Olympic bronze medalists for Finland
Olympic medalists in cross-country skiing
FIS Nordic World Ski Championships medalists in cross-country skiing
Medalists at the 1936 Winter Olympics
Sportspeople from Lapland (Finland)
20th-century Finnish people